Tangyan Township is a township of Lashio District in the Shan State of eastern Burma. The principal town is Tangyan. Tangyan emerged as an important centre for Panthay people (Chinese Muslims originally from neighbouring Yunnan) in the mid-20th century, especially after the destruction of Panglong during World War II.

History
There were clashes between Shan State Army (SSA) and Myanmar Army in Tangyan in 2011. Myanmar Army deployed local militias to monitor the SSA movement. SSA accused Myanmar Army using chemical weapon and recruiting women as forced porters in Tangyan during resume clashes. Some school teachers were killed also.

Beginning on 6 October 2015 a large scale offensive by the Tatmadaw comprising 20 Burma Army battalions has been launched in central Shan State. The aim of the military is to seize Shan ceasefire territories in Kehsi, Mong Nawng, Mong Hsu and Tangyan townships, using heavy artillery and with fighter jet and helicopter gunship air support to indiscriminately shell and bomb civilian areas. These attacks have displaced thousands of Shan, Palaung, Lisu and Lahu people causing a new humanitarian crisis.

Towns and villages

References

Townships of Shan State